Whitchurch Urban is a civil parish in Shropshire, England.  It contains 110 listed buildings that are recorded in the National Heritage List for England.  Of these, one is listed at Grade I, the highest of the three grades, seven are at Grade II*, the middle grade, and the others are at Grade II, the lowest grade.  The parish contains the market town of Whitchurch and areas to the north, west and east of the town.  Most of the listed buildings are in the town, and a high proportion are houses, shops, and public houses, the earliest of which are timber framed or have a timber framed core.  The other listed buildings in the town include churches, items in a churchyard, a country house, almshouses, a bank, offices, schools, hotels, a drinking fountain, and a war memorial.  Outside the town are farmhouses, a boundary stone, a milestone, and a road bridge.  The Llangollen Canal runs through the western part of the parish, and the listed buildings associated with it are a lock keeper's cottage and a lift bridge.


Key

Buildings

See also
Listed buildings in Whitchurch Rural

References

Citations

Sources

Lists of buildings and structures in Shropshire
Listed